"C'mon" is the debut single from Australian rock band The Screaming Jets. The song was released in December 1990 as the lead single from their debut extended play The Scorching Adventures of the Screaming Jets (1990). It was also included on their debut studio album, All for One (1991).

Track listing
CD single
 "C'mon" – 2:48	
 "Sister Tease" – 3:20	
 "Blue Sashes" – 3:28

Charts

References

1990 songs
1990 debut singles
The Screaming Jets songs
Songs written by Dave Gleeson